The Road to Love is a surviving 1916 American drama silent film directed by Scott Sidney and written by Blanche Dougan Cole and Gardner Hunting. The film stars Lenore Ulric, Colin Chase, Lucille Ward, Estelle Allen, Gayne Whitman and Herschel Mayall. The film was released on December 7, 1916, by Paramount Pictures.

Plot

Cast 
Lenore Ulric as Hafsa
Colin Chase as Gordon Roberts
Lucille Ward as Lella Sadiya
Estelle Allen as Zorah
Gayne Whitman as Karan 
Herschel Mayall as Sidi Malik
Joe Massey as The Old Sheik
Alfred Hollingsworth as Abdallah

Preservation status
A copy is preserved in the Library of Congress collection.

References

External links 
 

1916 films
1910s English-language films
Silent American drama films
1916 drama films
Paramount Pictures films
American black-and-white films
American silent feature films
Films directed by Scott Sidney
1910s American films